Lamprini "Labrina" Tsàkalou (born 7 August 1993) is a Greek female handballer who plays for AEK H.C. and the Greece national team.

Achievements
6 Trophies with OF Nea Ionia :

Greek Championship:
Winner: 2014, 2015, 2016, 2017
Greek Cup:
Winner: 2015, 2017

4 trophies with RK Krim:

 Slovenian Championship :
Winner: 2018, 2019
 Slovenian Cup:
Winner: 2018, 2019

1 trophy with RK Podravka Koprivnica:

 Croatian Championship :
Winner: 2021

References

1993 births
Living people
Sportspeople from Arta, Greece
Expatriate handball players
Greek expatriate sportspeople in Slovenia
Greek expatriate sportspeople in Croatia
Greek female handball players
Greek people of Democratic Republic of the Congo descent
RK Podravka Koprivnica players
Mediterranean Games competitors for Greece
Competitors at the 2018 Mediterranean Games